Highs in the Mid-Sixties, Volume 11 (subtitled Texas) is a compilation album in the Highs in the Mid-Sixties series, featuring recordings that were released in Texas.  This is one of five volumes in the series that collects songs by Texas bands; the others are Highs in the Mid-Sixties, Volume 12, Highs in the Mid-Sixties, Volume 13, Highs in the Mid-Sixties, Volume 17, and Highs in the Mid-Sixties, Volume 23.

Release data
This album was released in 1984 as an LP by AIP Records (as #AIP-10019).

Notes on the tracks
The unique "Good Times" might be the garage rock song that is least inspired by the British Invasion; the song was written by Allen and Ray Schram about an apartment they were renting in Irving, Texas. It was just a joke, but a friend, who was a dancer on the Ron Chapman TV show Sump'N Else, arranged a meeting with Chapman at his house. He played the lacquer demo down to the line "go out for entertainment, I park behind the Twin" (a drive-in movie that played edited X-rated films in Grand Prairie, and stopped it. He called GPC records and they pressed 100 copies. The night it was to be played on the Jimmy Rabbit radio show, (a popular KLIF 1190 DJ show), Robert Kennedy was shot and killed in California and KLIF started playing somber classical music; "Good Times" missed its release date.

Track listing

Side 1

 Larry and the Blue Notes: "In and Out" (L. Slater/L. Roquemore)
 The Buccaneers: "You Got What I Want" (M. Dallon) — rel. 1965
 Kit and the Outlaws: "Don't Tread on Me" (Kit Massengill)
 The Chants: "Hypnotized" (David Korfleet)
 The Visions: "Route 66" (Bobby Troup)
 The Esquires: "Judgment Day" (Horne/Snellings)
 The Four More: "Problem Child" — rel. 1966

Side 2
 Chaz & the Classics: "Girl of the 13th Hour" (C. Shian) — rel. 1966
 Terry & Tommy: "It Ain't No Good to Love Anybody"
 The By Fives: "I Saw You Walking"  (Williams/Stevens)
 The Staffs: "Another Love" (Raul Altamirano)
 Five of a Kind: "Never Again" (Wayne/Taylor)
 Nobody's Children: "Good Times" (Allen Schram)
 The Bourbons: "Of Old Approximately" (Lee) — rel. 1967

Pebbles (series) albums
1984 compilation albums
Music of Texas